The Lynn Armory is a historic armory building at 36 South Common Street in Lynn, Massachusetts. It is one of the best examples of Romanesque Revival architecture in the city. It was built in 1893 out of red sandstone to a design by Wheeler & Northend. The principal features of the facade are designed to evoke a fortified castle: circular towers  flank the entrance, and the towers and the front facade are topped by a crenellated parapet.

The armory was individually listed on the National Register of Historic Places in 1979, and included in the Lynn Common Historic District in 1992. A total of five Holman K. Wheeler structures in Lynn are listed on the National Register. 

In August 2018, Massachusetts Governor Charlie Baker signed into law a bill approving the sale of the armory to a non-profit organization that plans to renovate the facility into apartments for military veterans.

See also
National Register of Historic Places listings in Lynn, Massachusetts
National Register of Historic Places listings in Essex County, Massachusetts

References

Armories on the National Register of Historic Places in Massachusetts
Buildings and structures in Lynn, Massachusetts
Government buildings completed in 1893
Infrastructure completed in 1893
National Register of Historic Places in Lynn, Massachusetts
Historic district contributing properties in Massachusetts